The first Swedish Champion was Gustaf Nyholm, who won two matches against winners of national tournaments: Berndtsson in Göteborg and Löwenborg in Stockholm in 1917. Up until 1931 Swedish Chess Championships decided by match play. In the 1930s, Gideon Ståhlberg held the title in spite of results of the national tournaments. Since 1939, only the tournament is played as an official Swedish Championship.

Matches (official Champions)
{| class="sortable wikitable"
! Year !! Location !! Result
|-
| 1917 || Stockholm || Otto Löwenborg 3 – Anton Olson 2
|-
| 1917 || Gothenburg || Gustaf Nyholm 3½ – Karl Berndtsson 1½
|-
| 1917 || Stockholm || Gustaf Nyholm 4 – Otto Löwenborg 1
|-
| 1919 || Stockholm || Gustaf Nyholm 2½ – Arthur Håkansson 2½
|-
| 1919 || Stockholm || Gustaf Nyholm 3½ – Anton Olson 1½
|-
| 1921 || Gothenburg || Gustaf Nyholm 2½ – Allan Nilsson 2½
|-
| 1921 || Stockholm || Anton Olson 3 – Gustaf Nyholm 2
|-
| 1921 || Stockholm || Gustaf Nyholm 3½ – Anton Olson 1½
|-
| 1924 || Gothenburg || Allan Nilsson 3 – Gustaf Nyholm 1
|-
| 1927 || Gothenburg || Allan Nilsson 2½ – Gösta Stoltz 2½
|-
| 1929 || Gothenburg || Gideon Ståhlberg 3 – Allan Nilsson 0
|-
| 1931 || Gothenburg || Gideon Ståhlberg 3 – Gösta Stoltz 3
|}

Tournaments (no champions)
{| class="sortable wikitable"
! Year !! Location !! Champion
|-
| 1917 || Stockholm    ||   Anton Olson
|-
| 1918 || Gothenburg   || 
|-
| 1919 || Malmö        || 
|-
| 1920 || Eskilstuna    || 
|-
| 1921 || Jönköping    ||   Gustaf Nyholm
|-
| 1922 || Gävle        || 
|-
| 1923 || Uppsala      ||   Anton Olson
|-
| 1924 || Norrköping   || 
|-
| 1925 || Trollhättan  || 
|-
| 1926 || Karlstad     || 
|-
| 1927 || Örebro       ||   Gideon Ståhlberg
|-
| 1928 || Hälsinborg   || 
|-
| 1929 || Västerås     || 
|-
| 1931 || Uddevalla    || 
|-
| 1932 || Karlskrona   ||   Gideon Ståhlberg
|-
| 1933 || Lund         || 
|-
| 1934 || Falun        || 
|-
| 1935 || Härnösand    ||   John B. Lindberg
|-
| 1936 || Borås        || 
|-
| 1937 || Stockholm    || 
|-
| 1938 || Kalmar       || 
|}

Tournaments (official Champions)
{| class="sortable wikitable"
! Year !! Location !! Champion
|-
| 1939 || Stockholm    || 
|-
| 1940 * || Stockholm    || 
|-
| 1941 || Gothenburg   || 
|-
| 1942 || Östersund    || 
|-
| 1943 || Malmö        || 
|-
| 1944 || Lidköping    || 
|-
| 1945 || Visby        || 
|-
| 1946 || Motala       || 
|-
| 1947 || Stockholm    || 
|-
| 1948 || Sundsvall    || 
|-
| 1949 || Eskilstuna    || 
|-
| 1950 || Kristianstad || 
|-
| 1951 || Halmstad     || 
|-
| 1952 || Hålland      || 
|-
| 1953 || Örebro       || 
|-
| 1954 || Hälsingborg  || 
|-
| 1955 || Södertälje   || 
|-
| 1956 || Borås        || 
|-
| 1957 || Stockholm    || 
|-
| 1958 || Växjö        || 
|-
| 1959 || Västerås     || 
|-
| 1960 || Kiruna       || 
|-
| 1961 || Avesta       || 
|-
| 1962 || Örnsköldsvik  || 
|-
| 1963 || Karlskrona   || 
|-
| 1964 || Gothenburg   || 
|-
| 1965 || Falköping    || 
|-
| 1966 || Malmö        || 
|-
| 1967 || Stockholm    || 
|-
| 1968 || Norrköping   || 
|-
| 1969 || Sundsvall    || 
|-
| 1970 || Nässjö       || 
|-
| 1971 || Eskilstuna    || 
|-
| 1972 || Skellefteå   || 
|-
| 1973 || Bollnäs      || 
|-
| 1974 || Lund         || 
|-
| 1975 || Gothenburg   || 
|-
| 1976 || Motala       || 
|-
| 1977 || Stockholm    || 
|-
| 1978 || Degerfors    ||   Harry Schüssler
|-
| 1979 || Borås        || 
|-
| 1980 || Luleå        || 
|-
| 1981 || Ystad        || 
|-
| 1982 || Gävle        || 
|-
| 1983 || Karlskrona   || 
|-
| 1984 || Linköping    || 
|-
| 1985 || Uppsala      || 
|-
| 1986 || Malmö        || 
|-
| 1987 || Stockholm    || 
|-
| 1988 || Norrköping  || 
|-
| 1989 || Sundsvall   || 
|-
| 1990 || Gothenburg   || 
|-
| 1991 || Helsingborg  || 
|-
| 1992 || Borlänge     || 
|-
| 1993 || Lindesberg   || 
|-
| 1994 || Haparanda    || 
|-
| 1995 || Borlänge     || 
|-
| 1996 || Linköping    || 
|-
| 1997 || Haninge      || 
|-
| 1998 || Ronneby      || 
|-
| 1999 || Lidköping    || 
|-
| 2000 || Örebro       || 
|-
| 2001 || Linköping    || 
|-
| 2002 || Skara        || 
|-
| 2003 || Umeå         || 
|-
| 2004 || Gothenburg   || 
|-
| 2005 || Gothenburg   || 
|-
| 2006 || Gothenburg   || 
|-
| 2007 || Stockholm    || 
|-
| 2008 || Växjö || 
|-
| 2009 || Kungsör    || 
|-
| 2010 || Lund || 
|-
| 2011 || Västerås || 
|-
| 2012 || Falun || 
|-
| 2013 || Örebro || 
|-
| 2014 || Borlänge || Daniel Semcesen
|-
| 2015 || Sunne || Nils Grandelius
|-
| 2016 || Uppsala || Erik Blomqvist
|-
| 2017 || Stockholm    || 
|-
| 2018 || Ronneby      || 
|-
| 2019 || Eskilstuna    || Erik Blomqvist
|-
| 2020 ||     || NA
|-
| 2021 || Helsingborg    || Tiger Hillarp Persson
|}
 Tournament at Stockholm 1940 was unofficial Swedish championship.

Women

{| class="sortable wikitable"
! Year !! Champion
|-
| 1998 || Eva Berglund
|}

References

 2007 edition from TWIC
 Swedish Championship 2008

Chess national championships
Women's chess national championships
Championship
Chess